The 165th Army Division(3rd Formation) was activated in January 1970 in Longchuan, Guangdong province.

The division was a part of 55th Army Corps. The division was composed of:
493rd Infantry Regiment;
494th Infantry Regiment;
495th Infantry Regiment;
Artillery Regiment.

In February 1979 the division took part in the Sino-Vietnamese War.

In September 1985 the division was disbanded.

References

中国人民解放军各步兵师沿革，http://blog.sina.com.cn/s/blog_a3f74a990101cp1q.html

Infantry divisions of the People's Liberation Army
Military units and formations established in 1970
Military units and formations disestablished in 1985